York College of Pennsylvania is a private college in Spring Garden Township, Pennsylvania. It offers more than 70 baccalaureate majors in professional programs, the sciences, and humanities to 3,500 full-time undergraduate students. It also offers master's programs in business, public policy, education, and nursing, along with a doctoral program in nursing practice to over 400 postgraduate students.

History
York College of Pennsylvania traces its institutional lineage to the York County Academy, a school opened in the 1770s in downtown York, Pennsylvania that was connected to St. John's Episcopal Church, which was led by Rev. John Andrews, D.D. In 1787, the school received its charter from the General Assembly of Pennsylvania and was incorporated as the York County Academy. The academy held a close connection with St. John's Church in York from that time until 1799. Thaddeus Stevens taught at the academy in 1815–1816, prior to establishing his law practice and serving as a U.S. congressman.

York College also traces its roots to a second institution, the York Collegiate Institute (YCI), which was founded around 1872. The building that housed the institute, located on the corner of College Avenue and Duke Street, was destroyed by fire in December 1885. A new four-story building designed by architects John A. Dempwolf and Reinhardt Dempwolf was completed at the same location in late 1886. The building was demolished in 1969 after being sold.

In 1929, the York County Academy and YCI entered into a teaching agreement, then in 1941 merged to become York Junior College. Under its new charter, the combined institution shifted its focus from elementary and secondary education to post-secondary education. At this point, the school began to outgrow its campus, forcing a move outside of downtown York. In 1965, the current campus, located in Spring Garden Township, was dedicated. The former occupier of these lands was the Outdoor Country Club and golf course, which moved north of the city after selling its property. By 1968, York College established an accredited four-year bachelor's degree program, and officially became York College of Pennsylvania.

In 1975, York College absorbed York Country Day School (YCDS), thereby expanding its mission to again encompass K-12 education. YCDS was founded in 1953 by former YCI faculty after YCI phased out the elementary and secondary programs. Today the college sits near the historic center of York City, with some of its residence halls located in the city, which is known as the first national capital of the United States of America and the birthplace of Articles of Confederation.

The paper mill that was purchased recently is slated to be turned into a knowledge park.

Campus

York College is currently located on three adjacent campuses with the majority of its academic buildings on the Main Campus, a few on its more recently built West Campus and several facilities on its North Campus. Despite the college's extensive history, all the buildings on campus are less than 50 years of age, with the majority being built during the 1960s. The buildings utilize a standard red brickwork style, enhanced with white marble on some buildings. Some buildings on campus were financed with the college's cash savings in order to avoid debt as part of an overall focus on maintaining low tuition rates.

Main campus

The focal point of York College's 190-acre park-like campus is the mall, a grassy quad around which many of the college's academic buildings are located. The Evelyn and Earle Wolf Hall is the center for artistic activity on campus. It includes three art studios, a photography facility, rehearsal and practice rooms, a multi-track recording studio and mixing control room, a music library, editing suites, studios, two video production facilities coordinated by a computer-assisted control room, and DeMeester Recital Hall, a venue that hosts various speakers as well as performances by many of the college's musical ensembles. Also located in Wolf Hall are the York College Galleries. Comprising two adjacent galleries, the Cora Miller Gallery and the Brossman Gallery, this exhibition space serves the college, the City of York, and the communities of southcentral Pennsylvania and northern Maryland. The Galleries feature a varied program of nationally touring exhibitions and invitational shows, as well as faculty and juried student shows, artist and curator lectures, workshops, book signings, and other events.
Located adjacent to Wolf is Campbell Hall, home to the Student Success Division, which includes the Academic Advising Center, Academic Support Center, Career Development Center, Community Scholarship Program, Student Accessibility Services, Study Abroad Center, Undeclared Student Advising, and the Writing Center. Campbell also includes chemistry instrumentation to support majors in Chemistry, Forensic Chemistry and Pre-Med. Next to Campbell is the Appell Life Sciences Building, which features modern laboratory spaces, multiple specialty spaces (tissue culture suite, microscopy lab, walk-in cold room), research and preparation spaces, and student and faculty conference rooms for the departments of Biological Sciences, Behavioral Sciences and Education. Connected to Appell is the Willman Business Center, which opened in 2013 and is home to the Graham School of Business. Willman features the Weinstock Lecture Hall, a 150-seat tiered auditorium, the NASDAQ Trading Laboratory which provides students with direct access to real-time financial data from stock and commodities exchanges, and Yorkview Hall, a glass-enclosed corporate training center that offers fantastic views atop the center. 

The Naylor Ecological Sciences Center, located behind Appell, is a three-story structure topped by five greenhouses that provide teaching and research labs for ecological studies on plants and animals (Aquatic and Terrestrial Labs), a large aquarium space for students doing research with fish and invertebrates, a controlled growth chamber and research spaces.

Schmidt Library, located to the right of Willman on the mall, houses print and online collections, as well as the college's Archives. Schmidt Library loans out wireless laptops for use in the building, digital cameras, camcorders, and media projection materials. The building also provides quiet study floors, technology-enhanced group study rooms, comfortable lounge areas, and wireless network connections including the outdoor courtyard. The Library underwent extensive interior renovations in 2004, adding 17 group study areas along with infrastructure and equipment to facilitate an increased focus on digital media.

The Waldner Performing Arts Center (WPAC) and Humanities Center occupy the space between the Schmidt Library and the Iosue Student Union. The Waldner Performing Arts Center, which opened in fall 2008, features the 705-seat York Collegiate Theatre and the 125-seat Perko Playpen Theatre, an experimental black box-type theatre. The York College Players, who perform on both stages, enjoy a scene shop, green room and costume shop. The York Collegiate Theatre hosts musical performances, nationally recognized speakers and other special events.

The Humanities Center, home to the Department of History and Political Science and the Department of English and Humanities, features an oral history lab and museum studies room, film study labs and a film screening room, computer labs, and the Pura Vida Café. The World Languages Media Center allows students to further study in languages, and the Center for Teaching and Learning offers academic support (like tutoring and writing assistance) to students.

Between the Humanities and the Iosue Student Union sits The Rock or Old Spart. After commencement, the graduating class writes their names and messages in white on a large rock painted Spartan Green.

At the center of student life is the Robert V. Iosue Student Union. Johnson Dining Hall, located on the first floor, serves breakfast, lunch and dinner, and Spart's Den, in the lower level, offers a grab-and-go option, as well as a venue for entertainment such as comedy and music. The Student Activities and Orientation Office plans events for students, and also provide a number of leadership opportunities to more than 100 student clubs and organizations. The bookstore is a shop for student essentials. WVYC, the college radio station that broadcasts more than 100 hours each week, is located in the Student Union, as is the Admissions Welcome Center, where counselors offer information sessions and campus tours twice a day.

The Student Union also houses provides space for the nearly 100 student organizations at York College, and the Office of Residence Life occupies the second floor of the Student Union.

Adjacent to the Student Union is the Miller Administration Building. Bearing the name of the college's first president, the building includes the President's Office, the Office of Admissions, Academic Affairs, Business Affairs, Campus Operations, Financial Aid Office, and Registrar.
The Main campus is also home to many of York's 900 freshman students, who may reside in either one of the residence halls in the Penn/Beard Complex or the Manor Complex. Each complex houses about 500 students in 11 (six in Penn/Beard, five in Manor) traditional-style residence halls. Upperclassman residence halls on the main campus include Susquehanna Hall and the Tyler Run Complex, which house students in apartment-style suites, each accommodating two to four students. Students may also live in one of three communal living houses on main campus: Springettsbury Hall, Pershing House, and Springdale House.

The two oldest buildings on campus are the Brougher Chapel and the President's Home. In addition to the main worship area, Brougher contains space for religious activities, meditation, counseling and special events. As the center of faith at York, Brougher facilitates the services of a Catholic priest, Protestant minister, and Rabbi, all of whom are available to students for counseling, religious guidance, and support. There are four religious student organizations: Newman Club (Catholic Campus Ministry), Inter-Varsity Christian Fellowship, Christian Fellowship Organization, and Hillel.

The President's Home, a Williamsburg-style property adjacent to campus, is the setting for receptions for visiting artists, lecturers, and special guests.

The easternmost portion of campus features several athletic facilities: tennis courts, Spartan Softball Field, Jaquet Field (home to Spartan Baseball), the rugby field, and various intramural fields. Flowing through Main Campus is Tyler Run, a picturesque spring-fed brook lined with willows. It serves as the municipal boundary between York City and Spring Garden Township.

West Campus

At the center of West Campus sits the Grumbacher Sport and Fitness Center, a  complex featuring the Charles Wolf Gymnasium, a 1,712-seat arena hosting varsity competition in men's and women's basketball, volleyball and wrestling; a ten-lane competitive pool with instructional areas and 1- and 3-meter diving boards; a three-court field house; locker room facilities; a climbing wall; a cafe; and a  fitness area.  

Diehl Hall houses York's Stabler Department of Nursing, as well as the hospitality management and sports management programs. It was expanded in 2012 to better accommodate the growing needs of all three programs. Grantley Hall has general-use classrooms and is home to the Division of Advancement (Alumni Relations, Development, and Communications).

The West Campus residential quad consists of Richland Hall, Spring Garden Apartments, Brockie Commons, Country Club Apartments and Little Run Lodge, the last of which is a suite style residence hall complex which includes a student center with a dining facility, central mailboxes, multipurpose space, TV lounges, and game room. The West Campus residential quad primarily houses upperclassmen in apartment style residences that typically have room for anywhere from two to five students.

North Campus
The building also features gathering points for students to meet in small work groups or in social settings. The building was converted from a factory; it is LEED certified silver. It is named after the Kinsley Family Foundation.

Northside Commons is a 171-unit, five-story residence located on the northern end of campus. Completed in 2011, the building houses 275 students in single and double bedrooms. The building houses a mix of freshmen and returning students, the commons also includes lounge and common areas for residents.

Kings Mill Depot, located across the train tracks from Northside Commons, houses the college's J.D. Brown Center for Entrepreneurship, a hub for innovation and entrepreneurial activity at York College. A key component of the J.D. Brown Center is the business incubator, which gives small businesses resources such as office space, and access to York College's intellectual resources.

Organization and administration
The current president of York College is Pamela Gunter-Smith, who was selected as the fourth president and began serving as such on July 1, 2013. She previously served as a provost and academic vice president at Drew University and as the Porter Professor of Physiology at Spelman College. She succeeded George W. Waldner, who retired June 30, 2013, after 22 years as president. Other York College presidents include Ray A. Miller, Ph.D., (1968–1975) and Robert V. Iosue, Ph.D., (1976–1991). Iosue drew national attention for his controversial criticisms of what he regarded as the run-away expense of higher education. At York College, he was noted for paying faculty well but expecting them to spend more time teaching than they might be required to elsewhere. He himself worked weekends and took no vacations for eight years.

The Student Senate is the executive and administrative agency for York College students and embodies a unique system of government. All students who pay the student activity fee are automatically members of the Student Association and any student may attend meetings or address the Association on matters that are of concern to the student body.

Academics
York College offers its more than 50 baccalaureate majors through five schools: Graham School of Business; School of Nursing and Health Professions; Kinsley School of Engineering, Sciences, and Technology; School of Behavioral Sciences and Education; and School of the Arts, Communication, and Global Studies. Graduate offerings are master's programs in business administration, education, and nursing, along with a doctorate in nursing practice. The college's faculty includes 154 full-time professors. It is accredited by the Middle States Association of Colleges and Schools.

York College's focus is on preparing students for professional careers, while remaining an affordable private college. The college reports a 90% career placement rate.

As a cost-saving measure, York College requires its full-time professors to teach four courses per semester, compared to the norm of two or three at most U.S. colleges and universities.

Rankings
The college is ranked by U.S. News & World Report as 78th (tie) in its Regional Universities of the North category as of 2018 and is named a Best Northeastern College by The Princeton Review. The college is also included in Barron's Best Buys in College Education and is ranked by Parents and Colleges as eighth on its list of Top 10 Best Value Private Colleges and Universities. The college was listed among 100 "Colleges Worth Considering" nationwide by The Washington Post.

Student life

On-campus entertainment events are produced by the Campus Activities Board, a committee of the Student Senate.

York College is the host campus for WVYC, The Spartan (the student-led newspaper), and YCP Rhapsody, an a cappella singing group, along with as many as 90 other clubs and organizations. The college has two engineering-related student groups: The YCP Collegiate Engineering Society and YCP Women in Science and Engineering.

Social organizations
Fraternities and sororities involve around 15% of York College students. The following organizations are represented.

Fraternities:
Zeta Beta Tau (ΖΒΤ)
Kappa Delta Rho (ΚΔΡ) - Gamma Gamma Chapter
Kappa Delta Phi (ΚΔΦ)
Tau Kappa Epsilon (ΤΚΕ)
Phi Kappa Psi (ΦΚΨ) - Pennsylvania Rho Chapter
Phi Sigma Phi (ΦΣΦ)

Sororities:
Alpha Sigma Tau (ΑΣΤ) (Suspended for varied issues, Fall 2017)
Delta Phi Epsilon (ΔΦΕ)
Theta Phi Alpha (ΘΦΑ) (Suspended for hazing March 20, 2015)
Sigma Gamma Rho (ΣΓΡ)
Sigma Delta Tau (ΣΔΤ)
Phi Mu (ΦΜ)
Phi Sigma Sigma (ΦΣΣ)

York College also hosts the Alpha Zeta Chapter of the Phi Sigma Pi (ΦΣΠ) National Honor Fraternity as well as the Professional Chemistry Fraternity Alpha Chi Sigma (ΑΧΣ).

Athletics
The Athletics and Recreation department provides opportunities for students to participate in recreation, athletics and wellness activities. The department is housed in the  Grumbacher Sport and Fitness Center, which features a three-court field house with elevated indoor jogging track, a gymnasium that seats 1,700 spectators, a natatorium with 12 swimming lanes, a  fitness center, a  climbing wall, a racquetball court, multiple purpose rooms and a wrestling room. York College offers 22 varsity sports that compete in the Middle Atlantic Conferences. The Spartans have 10 men's and 11 women's programs and compete in NCAA Division III. Men's programs include baseball, basketball, cross country, golf, lacrosse, soccer, swimming, tennis, track and field, and wrestling. Women's programs include basketball, cross country, field hockey, golf, lacrosse, soccer, softball, swimming, tennis, track and field, and volleyball.

York College does not have a football team, though the sport's absence is a popular topic for speculation. One such tale holds that the game was banned by a former board member of the college after his son suffered a fatal concussion during a football game. While the institution was operating as York Collegiate Institute, there was an active football team. The college bookstore does sell York College Football t-shirts, with the phrase "Undefeated since 1787" printed on the back. These are one of the more popular clothing items sold by the York College Bookstore. Though it is true that no school named York College of Pennsylvania has been defeated in Football, since the 'tongue-in-cheek' quip references "since 1787"  the statement may not be one hundred percent truthful as the school did lose a football game in 1893 (when  York Collegiate Institute football team lost a game as reported in The Philadelphia Inquirer.  However, the game played that day in 1893 did not allow forward passes nor did the center snap the ball back to a quarterback (as those rules were not adopted until 1905 when John Heisman introduced the rules). Hence, it may be reasonably argued that the game was a form of rugby football and not American Football to which the phrase was clearly intended such that a York College T-shirt with the phrase "Undefeated since 1787"  is true as York College has never lost an American football game.

Notable alumni
Glenn Hetrick, Makeup Artist and Judge on Syfy competition show Face Off (American TV series)
Matt Whitcher, Short-stick defensive midfielder for the Waterdogs Lacrosse Club of the Premier Lacrosse League
Ryan Kennedy, Defensemen for the Redwoods Lacrosse Club of the Premier Lacrosse League

References

External links
 
 York College of Pennsylvania official athletics website

 
Buildings and structures in York, Pennsylvania
1787 establishments in Pennsylvania
Eastern Pennsylvania Rugby Union
Educational institutions established in 1787
Universities and colleges in York County, Pennsylvania
Private universities and colleges in Pennsylvania